Dayanand Ganesh Narvekar (Konkani language: दयानंद नावे॔कर), born on 11 February 1950, is an Indian politician from the state of Goa. He served as the Speaker of the Legislative Assembly of Goa from January 1985 to September 1989. He has also been the Finance Minister and the Deputy Chief Minister of Goa. 

Narvekar was a member of the Indian National Congress for 35 years. He is a member of Aam Aadmi Party.

References

External links
 "GoaVidhanSabha.gov" 
 "India TV News", Goa's deputy CM post based on Karnataka model, 6 October 2012
 "Navhind Times", Narvekar’s new Goa Democratic Front to contest both LS seats, 3 March 2014

Candidates in the 2014 Indian general election
Speakers of the Goa Legislative Assembly
Deputy chief ministers of Goa
Indian National Congress politicians
Living people
1950 births
Maharashtrawadi Gomantak Party politicians
Indian National Congress (U) politicians